Vrh is a small village south of Podgora in the Municipality of Loška Dolina in the Inner Carniola region of Slovenia.

Mass grave
Vrh is the site of a mass grave from the period immediately after the Second World War. It was used after the war to liquidate opponents of the communist movement.

Church

The local church in the settlement is dedicated to Saint Thomas and belongs to the Parish of Stari Trg.

References

External links

Vrh on Geopedia

Populated places in the Municipality of Loška Dolina